Green Park is a London Underground station located on the edge of Green Park, with entrances on both sides of Piccadilly. It is served by the Jubilee, Piccadilly and Victoria lines. On the Jubilee line it is between Bond Street and Westminster; on the Piccadilly line it is between Piccadilly Circus and Hyde Park Corner and on the Victoria line it is between Victoria and Oxford Circus. It is in fare zone 1.

The station was opened in 1906 by the Great Northern, Piccadilly and Brompton Railway (GNP&BR) and was originally named Dover Street due to its location in that street. It was modernised in the 1930s when lifts were replaced with escalators and extended in the 1960s and 1970s when the Victoria and Jubilee lines were constructed.

The station is near The Ritz Hotel, the Royal Academy of Arts, St James's Palace, Berkeley Square, Bond Street, the Burlington Arcade and Fortnum & Mason, and is one of two serving Buckingham Palace (the other being St James's Park).

History

Piccadilly line

Rival schemes
During the final years of the 19th century and the early years of the 20th century numerous competing schemes for underground railways through central London were proposed. A number of the schemes submitted to parliament for approval as private bills included proposals for lines running under Piccadilly with stations in the area of the current Green Park station.

The first two proposals came before parliament in 1897. The Brompton and Piccadilly Circus Railway (B&PCR) proposed a line between South Kensington and Piccadilly Circus and the City and West End Railway (C&WER) proposed a line between Hammersmith and Cannon Street. The B&PCR proposed a station on the north side at Dover Street and the C&WER proposed a station on the south side at Arlington Street. Following review by parliament, the C&WER bill was rejected and the B&PCR bill was approved and received royal assent in August 1897.

In 1902, the Charing Cross, Hammersmith and District Railway (CCH&DR) proposed a line between Charing Cross and Barnes with a parallel shuttle line running between Hyde Park Corner and Charing Cross. A station was planned at Walsingham House on the north-east corner of Green Park. This scheme was rejected by parliament.

The same year, the Central London Railway (CLR, now the central section of the Central line) submitted a bill that aimed to turn its line running between Shepherd's Bush and Bank into a loop by constructing a second roughly parallel line to the south. This would have run along Piccadilly with a station at St James's Street just to the east of Dover Street. Delayed while a royal commission considered general principles of underground railways in London, the scheme was never fully considered and although it was re-presented in 1903, it was dropped two years later.

A third scheme for 1902 was the Piccadilly, City and North East London Railway (PC&NELR) which proposed a route between Hammersmith and Southgate. It planned a station at Albemarle Street, just to the east of Dover Street. Although favoured in parliament and likely to be approved, this scheme failed due to a falling-out between the backers and the sale of part of the proposals to a rival.

In 1905, some of the promoters of the PC&NELR regrouped and submitted a proposal for the Hammersmith, City and North East London Railway. As the CLR had done previously, the company proposed a station at St James's Street. Owing to failures in the application process, this scheme was also rejected.

Construction and opening
While the various rival schemes were unsuccessful in obtaining parliamentary approval, the B&PCR was unsuccessful in raising the funds needed to construct its line. It was not until after the B&PCR had been taken over by Charles Yerkes's Metropolitan District Electric Traction Company that the money became available. Tunnelling began in 1902 shortly before the B&PCR was merged with the Great Northern and Strand Railway to create the Great Northern, Piccadilly and Brompton Railway (GNP&BR, the predecessor of the Piccadilly line).

The GNP&BR opened the station on 15 December 1906 as Dover Street. As with most of the other GNP&BR stations, the station building, on the east side of Dover Street, was designed by Leslie Green. It featured the company's standard red glazed terracotta facade with wide semi-circular arches at first-floor level. Platform and passageway walls were decorated in glazed cream tiles in Green's standard arrangement with margins, patterning and station names in mid-blue. When it opened, the station to the west was Down Street. The station was provided with four Otis electric lifts paired in two  diameter shafts and a spiral stair in a smaller shaft.

Reconstruction
The station was busy and unsuccessful attempts to control crowds with gates at platform level were made in 1918. In the 1930s, the station was included amongst those modernised in conjunction with the northern and western extensions of the Piccadilly line. A new sub-surface ticket hall was opened on 18 September 1933 with a pair of Otis escalators provided to replace the lifts. The new ticket hall was accessed from subway entrances in Piccadilly. On the north side, an entrance was provided in Devonshire House on the corner with Stratton Street; on the south side an entrance was constructed on a piece of land taken from the park. The shelter for the southern entrance was designed by Charles Holden. The original station building, the lifts and the redundant below-ground passages were closed and the station was renamed Green Park. Part of the ground floor was used as a tea shop until the 1960s. In 1955, a third escalator was added to help deal with increased passenger numbers.

Victoria line

Proposals for an underground line linking Victoria to Finsbury Park date from 1937 when planning by the London Passenger Transport Board (LPTB) for future services considered a variety of new routes and extensions to existing lines. Parliament approved the line in 1955, but a shortage of funds meant that work did not start until after government loans were approved in 1962.

Construction works began in 1962. The 1930s ticket hall under the roadway of Piccadilly was enlarged to provide space for new Victoria line escalators and a long interchange passageway was provided between the Victoria line and Piccadilly line platforms. In 1965 a collapse of soft ground during the excavation of one of the tunnels near Green Park station meant that the ground had to be chemically stabilised before work could continue. The disused station building in Dover Street was demolished the following year in conjunction with the works for the new line. A vent shaft was constructed and an electrical sub-station was built in the basement of the new building. The 1930s entrance on the south side of Piccadilly was also reconstructed.

The enlarged ticket hall, new platforms and passageways were decorated in grey tiles. Platform roundel signs were on backlit illuminated panels. Seat recesses on the Victoria line platforms were tiled in an abstract pattern by Hans Unger of coloured circles representing a bird's-eye view of trees in Green Park.

After trial running of empty trains from 24 February 1969, the Victoria line platforms opened on 7 March 1969 with the opening of the third stage of the line between Warren Street and Victoria. The same day, Queen Elizabeth II officially opened the line by riding a train from Green Park to Oxford Circus.

Jubilee line

The origins of the Jubilee line are less clearly defined than those of the Victoria line. During World War II and throughout the 1950s and early 1960s consideration was given to various routes connecting north-west and south-east London via the West End and the City of London. Planning of the Victoria line had the greater priority and it was not until after construction of that line started that detailed planning began for the new line, first called the Fleet line in 1965 as it was planned to run in an east–west direction along Fleet Street. Lack of funding meant that only the first stage of the proposed line, from Baker Street to Charing Cross, received royal assent in July 1969; funding was agreed in August 1971.

Tunnelling began in February 1972 and was completed by the end of 1974. In 1977, during construction of the stations, the name of the line was changed to the Jubilee line, to mark the Queen's Silver Jubilee that year. A construction shaft in Hays Mews north of the station was used for an electrical substation and ventilation shaft. At Green Park, the ticket hall was enlarged slightly to provide space for escalators for the new line which connect to an intermediate concourse providing interchange between the Jubilee and Victoria lines. Interchange between the Jubilee and Piccadilly lines was via the ticket hall. Platform walls were tiled in a deep red with black leaf patterns by June Fraser. Trial running of trains began in August 1978 and the Jubilee line opened on 1 May the next year. The line had been officially opened by Prince Charles the previous day, starting with a train journey from Green Park to Charing Cross. In 1993, to alleviate congestion, a third escalator was installed in the lower flight to replace a fixed staircase.

Work on the Fleet line's stages 2 and 3 did not proceed and it was not until 1992 that an alternative route was approved. The Jubilee line extension took the line south of the River Thames via Waterloo, which was impractical to reach from the line's existing terminus at Charing Cross. New tunnels branching from the original route south of Green Park were to be constructed, and the line to Charing Cross was to be closed. Tunnelling began in May 1994, and improvements were carried out at Green Park to provide a direct passageway connection between the Jubilee and Piccadilly lines, including lifts to the  platforms at each end. A new ventilation shaft and an emergency exit to Arlington Street were built. The new extension opened in stages starting at Stratford in the east, with services to Charing Cross ending on 19 November 1999 and the final section between Green Park and Waterloo opening the following day.

Recent changes

In 2008, Transport for London (TfL) announced a project to provide step-free access to all three lines in advance of the 2012 London Olympics. The project also included the construction of a new entrance on the south side of Piccadilly with ramped access directly from Green Park designed by Capita Symonds and Alacanthus LW architects. Work commenced in May 2009 to install two lifts from the ticket hall to the Victoria line platforms and the interchange passageway to the Piccadilly line. This work and a third lift in the new park-side entrance between the street level and the ticket hall were completed ahead of schedule in 2011. At the same time, Green Park station underwent a major improvement programme which saw the tiling on the Victoria and Piccadilly line platforms and the interchange passageways replaced. When the Jubilee line opened, the Hans Unger tiling in the seat recesses of the Victoria line platforms was replaced with a design using the leaf patterns used on the Jubilee line platforms; the Unger design was reinstated during the restoration.

The new park entrance and street level shelter feature artwork within the Portland stone cladding titled Sea Strata designed by John Maine RA. The Diana Fountain was relocated from its original site in the centre of the park to form the centrepiece of the new entrance.

To help moderate temperatures in the station, a system using cool ground water extracted from boreholes sunk  into the chalk aquifer below London was installed.

Proposal for new connection
In July 2005, a report, DLR Horizon 2020 Study, for the Docklands Light Railway (DLR) examined "pragmatic development schemes" to expand and improve the DLR network between 2012 and 2020. One of the proposals was an extension of the DLR from Bank to Charing Cross. Unused tunnels under Strand constructed as part of Stage 1 of the Fleet line would be enlarged to accommodate the larger DLR trains. In 2011, the DLR published a proposal to continue the extension to Victoria via Green Park. No further work has been done on these proposals.

Piccadilly bombing

At around 9:00 pm on 9 October 1975, members of the Provisional IRA's Balcombe Street Gang detonated a bomb at a bus stop outside Green Park station, killing 23-year-old Graham Ronald Tuck and injuring 20 others. The attack was part of a bombing campaign carried out by the gang and in addition to the death and injuries caused damage to the Ritz Hotel and neighbouring buildings.

Services and connections

Services
The station is in Travelcard Zone 1, between Bond Street and Westminster on the Jubilee line, Hyde Park Corner and Piccadilly Circus on the Piccadilly line and Victoria and Oxford Circus on the Victoria line. On weekdays Jubilee line trains typically run every 2–2 minutes between 05:38 and 00:34 northbound and 05:26 and 00:45 southbound; on the Piccadilly line trains typically run every 2½–3½ minutes between 05:48 and 00:34 westbound and 00:32 eastbound, and on the Victoria line trains typically run every 100–135 seconds between 05:36 and 00:39 northbound and 05:36 and 00:31 southbound.

As of  it is the  station on the London Underground with  million passengers using it per year.

Connections
London Buses routes 6, 9, 14, 19, 22 and 38 and night routes N9, N19, N22, N38 and N97 serve the station.

In popular culture 
The opening scene of the 1997 film version of Henry James's The Wings of the Dove was set on the eastbound platforms at both Dover Street and Knightsbridge stations, both represented by the same studio mock-up, complete with a working recreation of a 1906 Stock train.

Notes and references

Notes

References

Bibliography

External links

 

Jubilee line stations
Piccadilly line stations
Victoria line stations
London Underground Night Tube stations
Tube stations in the City of Westminster
Former Great Northern, Piccadilly and Brompton Railway stations
Railway stations in Great Britain opened in 1906
Buildings and structures in Mayfair
Buildings and structures on Piccadilly
Buildings and structures in Green Park
1906 establishments in England